The 1928–29 season was the 31st in the history of the Southern League. The league consisted of Eastern and Western Divisions. Kettering Town won the Eastern Division and Plymouth Argyle reserves won the Western Division. Plymouth reserves were declared Southern League champions after winning a championship play-off at Kettering 4-2.

Three clubs from the Southern League applied to join the Football League, although none were successful. Two clubs (both from the Eastern Division) left the league at the end of the season.

Eastern Division

A total of 19 teams contest the division, including 18 sides from previous season and one new team.

Newly elected team:
 Thames Association

Western Division

A total of 14 teams contest the division, including 13 sides from previous season and one new team.

Newly elected team:
 Lovells Athletic

Football League election
Three Southern League clubs, Aldershot Town, Thames Association and Kettering Town, applied to join the Football League. However, both League clubs were re-elected.

References

1928-29
4
1928–29 in Welsh football